Michał Woysym-Antoniewicz (July 7, 1897 – December 1, 1989) was a Polish equestrian who competed in the 1928 Summer Olympics. He was born in Kraków and died in Austin, Texas, United States.

He won the silver medal in the team jumping with his horse Readgleadt. In the individual jumping he finished twentieth.

In the team three-day event he won the bronze medal with his horse Moja Miła after finishing nineteenth in the individual three-day event.

External links
profile 
dataOlympics profile
Michał Antoniewicz's profile at Sports Reference.com

1897 births
1989 deaths
Polish male equestrians
Equestrians at the 1928 Summer Olympics
Olympic equestrians of Poland
Olympic silver medalists for Poland
Olympic bronze medalists for Poland
Olympic medalists in equestrian
Sportspeople from Kraków
Polish Austro-Hungarians
Medalists at the 1928 Summer Olympics
20th-century Polish people